is a railway station in Itoda, Fukuoka Prefecture, Japan. It is on the Itoda Line, operated by the Heisei Chikuhō Railway. Trains arrive roughly every hour.

External links
Matsuyama Station (Heisei Chikuhō Railway website)

References

Railway stations in Fukuoka Prefecture
Railway stations in Japan opened in 1997
Heisei Chikuhō Railway Itoda Line